Joseph or Joe Grant may refer to:

 Joseph Grant (poet) (1805–1835), Scottish poet
 Joseph Xavier Grant (1940–1966), United States Army officer and Medal of Honor recipient
 Joe Grant (1908–2005), American artist and writer for the Walt Disney Company
 Joe Grant (cricketer) (born 1967), Jamaican cricketer
 Joe Grant (ice hockey) (1957–2011), Canadian ice hockey player